Trophodeinus is a genus of flies in the family Phoridae.

Species
T. analis Borgmeier, 1960
T. arizonensis (Borgmeier, 1963)
T. barberi Borgmeier, 1962
T. chelifer (Borgmeier, 1963)
T. denticulatus (Borgmeier, 1963)
T. lobatus (Borgmeier, 1963)
T. pygmaeus Borgmeier, 1962
T. spatulatus (Borgmeier, 1963)

References

Phoridae
Platypezoidea genera